Wild and Woolly is a 1932 American Western short animated film by Walter Lantz Productions. It stars Oswald the Lucky Rabbit.

Plot
In a town in the Old West, the girl beagle comes to a bank to make a deposit. The banker is none other than Oswald the Lucky Rabbit. Momentarily a gun-slinging rottweiler also comes to the bank, and causes a frenzy, even shoving an umbrella down an old woman's throat. Oswald flees the bank with the girl beagle's money.

Oswald leaves town on a horse, although he is being followed by the rottweiler who is also on a horse. The chase continues until they reach a cabin which Oswald enters. Unfortunately, the house is occupied by a thin dog who is an accomplice of the rottweiler. After the rottweiler breaks in, another frenzy ensues until the thin dog gets thrown out of the cabin. Nearby buzzards eat at the thin dog until that canine is nothing but a skeleton. Back in the cabin, Oswald is still having trouble with the rottweiler. To protect the girl beagle's cash, Oswald swallows the sack. The rotweiler punches Oswald. The punch sends Oswald bouncing off the walls until he knocks off a goat's skull that falls on and covers his head. Oswald uses the skull to bash the rotweiler around and out of the cabin before locking the door. The rotweiler tries to break back in using a log. But upon doing so, the rotweiler overshoots and falls into a canyon which is on the other side of the house. The rottweiler ends up in the bottom, getting pummeled by two jaguars.

Oswald is seen just outside the cabin relaxed. He is momentarily greeted and approached by the girl beagle. When Oswald tries to kiss her, the girl beagle asks for her money. Oswald manages to pull out the sack through his mouth. The rabbit and his canine girlfriend go on with the kissing.

Reused animation
The part where Oswald bounces off the walls is reused from A Wet Knight.

Other spellings
In a Guild/Firelight Video reissue, the film is presented as Wild and Wooly. And in Michael Fitzgerald's book Universal Pictures, it is mentioned as Wild and Wooley.

References

External links
 Wild and Woolly at the Big Cartoon Database
 

1932 films
1932 animated films
1930s American animated films
1930s animated short films
1932 Western (genre) films
American black-and-white films
Films directed by Walter Lantz
Oswald the Lucky Rabbit cartoons
Universal Pictures animated short films
Walter Lantz Productions shorts
Animated films about dogs
American Western (genre) films